Shushukovo is a rural locality (a village) in Sidorovskoye Rural Settlement, Gryazovetsky District, Vologda Oblast, Russia. The population was 12 as of 2002.

Geography 
Shushukovo is located 32 km east of Gryazovets (the district's administrative centre) by road. Ragozino is the nearest rural locality.

References 

Rural localities in Gryazovetsky District